The 2019-20 Alaska Nanooks men's ice hockey season was the 71st season of play for the program, the 36th at the Division I level and the 7th in the WCHA conference. The Nanooks represented the University of Alaska Fairbanks and were coached by Erik Largen, in his 2nd season.

Departures

Recruiting

Roster

As of September 9, 2019.

Standings

Schedule and results

|-
!colspan=12 style=";" | Regular Season

|-
!colspan=12 style=";" | 

|- align="center" bgcolor="#e0e0e0"
|colspan=12|Alaska Lost Series 0–2

Scoring statistics

Goaltending statistics

Rankings

References

2019-20
Alaska
Alaska
Alaska
Alaska